Gambellara is a town and comune in the province of Vicenza, Veneto, Italy. It is northwest of European route E70.

Gambellara is known for its wine production. The area has one DOC classified wine, Gambellara classico and Recioto de Gambellara which was in 2009 upgraded from DOC-level to the highest Italian appellation DOCG. The Recioto is also often made in a sparkling, vat-fermented, version.

The vineyards are dominated by Garganega grapes trained in the traditional "Veronese pergola" system, though a few producers have recently changed to more modern training systems. Most wineyards are cultivated on steep hills with terraces.

The  largest producer in Gambellara is the family-owned Zonin.

Twin towns
Gambellara is twinned with:

  Butera, Italy

Sources

(Google Maps)

Cities and towns in Veneto